Subramaniyan Karuppaiya (born 25 May 1939), known by his stage name Goundamani, is an Indian actor and comedian who works in Tamil cinema. He is known for his comic duo partnership in Tamil films with fellow actor Senthil. The pair dominated the Tamil industry as comedians in the 1980s and 90s. 

He was called Goundamani after acting as a Gounder in one of his early day dramas and the pseudonym stuck with him forever. He has the ability to give counter dialogues on the spot and off the script on stage and during shooting but it has nothing to do with his screen name, contrary to popular belief (as counter is a term that was popular only from the late 2000s). He was at his peak of his career as a comedian in Tamil cinema for nearly 40 years. Despite his popularity, Goundamani is known for being a social recluse.

Early life 
Goundamani was born as Subramaniyan on 25 May 1939 in Vallakundapuram, a village near Pollachi in Coimbatore, Tamil Nadu, India. His father is Karuppaiya and his mother is Annammal. He married Shanthi in 1963 and has 2 daughters.

Career 
On having interest in acting, he went to Chennai and initially started acting in theatre dramas and then entered into the Tamil film industry (Kollywood) due to his strong theatrical background.

He made his film acting debut in Thenum Paalum (1964) where he featured in a minor and uncredited role as a driver. He made his full fledged debut in 1977 film 16 Vayathinile where he played the role of Rajinikanth's sidekick. His role in the 1977 P. Bharathiraja directorial was also Goundamani's first credited role in his film 

Goundamani has played lead roles in a few films during his career, but is predominantly a supporting actor playing comedy roles. While performing roles of a solo comedian in films, he often co-starred with Senthil to form a comedy duo. The pair was described as "Tamil cinema's Laurel and Hardy" and have performed slapstick humour in many Tamil films from the mid-1980s until the early 2000s. Both of them are also remembered as partners-in-crime and also known for their chemistry.

Both Goundamani and Senthil were critically acclaimed for their career defining performance in Gangai Amaren's directorial Karakattakkaran (1989). Karakattakaran also coincidentally marked Goundamani and Senthil's 100th film as comedians together. Senthil and Goundamani both reportedly spent full 28 days on set during the shooting of the film. Goundamani's phrases in one of the comedy scenes featured in Karakattakaran, "Adhu enda enna pathu andha kelvi ketta?" when Senthil asked him "Intha cara vachiruntha Sopanasundhariya yaaru vaichiruka" became the highlight of the film and later became viral internet memes.

Goundamani's comedy scene from Thangamana Raasa (1989) is also best remembered by critics for dreaming of singing under the music of Ilaiyaraja when he was spending a jail term for petty crime. His one line phrases "Start the music" and "Arasiyal la ithellam saatharnamappa" which featured in the 1992 film Suriyan also later became a viral meme and trendsetter in Internet.

After recuperating from diabetes and respiratory illnesses during the late 2000s, he featured in Vaaimai and also played the lead role in 49-O, which began productions in 2013. It was directed by debutant Arokiadoss, a former assistant of Gautham Vasudev Menon. In 2019, he was approached by film director R. Kannan and actor Santhanam to cast him in a supporting role for their film project but Goundamani reportedly turned down the offer as he was sceptical about the role.

Partial filmography

1960s

1970s

1980s

1990s

2000s

2010s

References

External links
 

Tamil comedians
Living people
Male actors in Tamil cinema
People from Coimbatore district
1938 births
Indian male film actors